Southern Freeez is the debut album by the British jazz-funk band Freeez, first released in 1981 by John Rocca on his Pink Rhythm record label and then signed to Beggars Banquet.

In 2020, Beggars Banquet released a remastered version of the album as part of a double album titled Southern Freez/Variations on a Theem, the second part of which contains new recordings by Rocca, including a new version of the track "Southern Freez" itself.

Track listing
All songs written by Freeez except where noted.
"Mariposa" - 5:40 
"Caribbean Winter" - 5:15 
"Easy On The Onions" - 2:37 
"Sunset" - 4:38
"Flying High" (Peter Maas) - 5:30 
"Southern Freeez" (Andy Stennett, John Rocca, Peter Maas) - 5:40
"Roller Chase" - 5:07
"First Love" - 4:22
"Finale" - 1:59

Producer
John Rocca

Personnel

Freeez
John Rocca - percussion, vocals
Peter Maas - bass guitar, vocals
Andy Stennett - keyboard
Paul Morgan - drums

Additional musicians
Geoff Warren - saxophone, flute
David Allison - trombone
Lawrie Brown - trumpet
Gordon Sullivan - guitar
Andy Stennett - horns arrangement

Engineers
Simon Sullivan 
Paul Burry

Special
Ingrid Mansfield Allman - vocals (on track no. 6)

Album information
Record label: Beggars Banquet
All songs written by Freeez

Charts

References

See also 
 Freeez
 John Rocca
 Southern Freeez

Freeez albums
1981 debut albums
Beggars Banquet Records albums